Venus is the first album by We Are the Fury. It was released on May 22, 2007.

Track listing

References

2007 albums
We Are the Fury albums